The thick-billed heleia (Heleia crassirostris), also known as the Flores white-eye, is a species of bird in the family Zosteropidae. It is found in the  Indonesian islands of Sumbawa and Flores. Its natural habitats are subtropical or tropical dry forest, subtropical or tropical moist lowland forest, and subtropical or tropical moist montane forest.

References

thick-billed heleia
Birds of the Lesser Sunda Islands
Sumbawa
Flores Island (Indonesia)
thick-billed heleia
Taxonomy articles created by Polbot